"Hold On" is a song written and recorded by Canadian singer Sarah McLachlan. It was released in February 1994 as the second single from her album, Fumbling Towards Ecstasy (1993). In 2008, "Hold On" was included on McLachlan's greatest hits compilation, Closer: The Best of Sarah McLachlan.

McLachlan was inspired to write "Hold On" after watching a Canadian documentary titled A Promise Kept. Speaking to the Huffington Post in 2014, she said: "I saw a documentary on a woman whose husband contracted the HIV virus and it was a great and tragic love story. She took care of him up until he died and her passion, empathy and strength was inspirational."

Track listing
Canadian CD single
"Hold On" – 4:06
"Hold On II" – 3:39
"Mary" (Early Demo) – 3:57

US promotional single
"Hold On" (New Version) – 3:56
"Hold On" (Live Version) – 4:10

Other versions
"Hold On" (Freedom Sessions) – 6:43, 
"Hold On" (Live) – 5:18, 
"Hold On" (BT Mix) – 7:44, 
"Hold On" (Live) – 5:53,

Commercial performance
"Hold On" debuted on the RPM Canadian Singles Chart in February 1994 and peaked at number 59 in April 1994. It also entered the US Alternative Songs Chart in January 1995 and reached number 29 the next month.

Charts

References

1993 songs
1994 singles
Sarah McLachlan songs
Songs written by Sarah McLachlan
Nettwerk Records singles